Frances Jones Bonner (1919 - December 27, 2000) was an American psychoanalyst.

Early life and education
Frances Estelle Jones was born in 1919 in St. Louis, Missouri. Her parents were David Dallas Jones and Susie Pearl Willams. Bonner's family moved to Greensboro, North Carolina in 1926 when her father became President of Bennett College for Women. Her mother worked as an administrator at Bennett College.  After graduating high school, Bonner enrolled at Bennett College. She was very active in school activities and played on Bennett's basketball team. During her undergraduate tenure in 1937, Bonner led a protest and boycott of the downtown Greensboro movie theaters because of the depictions of black women in film. Her advisors during this protest were R. Nathaniel Dett and future college President Willa Beatrice Player. After graduating from Bennett College in 1939, she went on to study abroad for a one year.  Upon returning, Bonner was accepted to Boston University medical school where she graduated in 1943. She trained as a neurologist at Boston City Hospital, completing her training in 1949.

Career 
After completing her neurology training at Boston City Hospital, Bonner was hired at Massachusetts General Hospital in 1949 becoming the first African American woman to train and to become a faculty member at the hospital.  During her time at MGH, she became the first winner of the Helen Putnam Fellowship from Radcliffe College.  She worked at MGH for 50 years.

Death and legacy 
Bonner died on December 27, 2000. Massachusetts General Hospital named the Frances J. Bonner, MD Award after her.

References

External links

Bennett College alumni
Boston University School of Medicine alumni
African-American psychologists
American social scientists
1919 births
2000 deaths
20th-century African-American people